Lift Every Voice may refer to:

 "Lift Every Voice and Sing", a 1900 song written as a poem by James Weldon Johnson and set to music by his brother Rosamond Johnson
 Lift Every Voice and Sing (sculpture), a 1939 sculpture by Augusta Savage
 Lift Every Voice (Andrew Hill album), an album recorded in 1969 by jazz pianist Andrew Hill
 Lift Every Voice and Sing (album), an album recorded in 1971 by jazz drummer and percussionist Max Roach
 Lift Every Voice (Malachi Thompson album), 1993 album by jazz trumpeter Malachi Thompson
 Lift Every Voice (Charles Lloyd album), an album recorded in 2002 by jazz saxophonist Charles Lloyd
 Lift Every Voice, a Sunday morning television show on BET devoted to contemporary gospel music